The Symphony No. 1 in E major, K. 16, is a symphony written in 1764 by Wolfgang Amadeus Mozart at the age of eight years. By this time, he was already notable in Europe as a wunderkind performer, but had composed little music.

The autograph score (handwritten original) of the symphony is today preserved in the Biblioteka Jagiellońska in Kraków.

Background

The symphony was written on the Mozart family's Grand Tour of Europe in London when they had to move to Chelsea during the summer of 1764 due to Mozart's father Leopold's throat infection. The house at 180 Ebury Street, now in the borough of Westminster, where this symphony was written, is marked with a plaque. The symphony was first performed on 21 February 1765. The work shows the influence of several composers, including his father and the sons of Johann Sebastian Bach, especially Johann Christian Bach, an important early symphonist working in London whom Mozart had met during his time there.

Movements and instrumentation
The symphony is scored for 2 oboes, 2 horns in E, and strings.

The work is in 3 movements:

Molto allegro, 
Andante, C minor, 
Presto, 

In the second movement, the eight-year-old Mozart makes use of the four note motif that appears in the finale of his Jupiter symphony, No. 41. The four notes, C, D, F, E, make an appearance in several of Mozart's works, including his Symphony No. 33. This theme is stated by the horns in his first symphony.

In his book on the piano concertos, Cuthbert Girdlestone pointed out the similarity between the opening of this symphony and that of Mozart's Piano Concerto No. 22, K. 482, composed some twenty years later.

References

External links

01
1764 compositions
Compositions in E-flat major